"Ghosts" is the debut single by Laura Marling. It was released on December 2, 2007 as the lead single from her debut album Alas, I Cannot Swim. The song peaked to number 108 on the UK Singles Chart.

Music video
A music video to accompany the release of "Ghosts" was first released onto YouTube on 12 March 2009 at a total length of three minutes and three seconds.

Track listing

Chart performance

Release history

References

2007 singles
Laura Marling songs
2007 songs
Virgin Records singles